Guillem Sagrera (Felanitx, Mallorca ca. 1380–Naples, 1456) was a Gothic sculptor and architect from Mallorca.

A native of Felanitx, in Mallorca, in the early 15th century he was director of the works of the Cathedral of Perpignan (then part of the Kingdom of Mallorca) in late-Gothic style; in the same style is  La Seu Cathedral of Palma de Mallorca, in which he also served as director of the works.  In Palma is also what is considered his masterwork, the Llotja dels Mercaders (1426–1447).

He also worked at the court of Alfonso V of Aragon in Naples, where he restored the Castel Nuovo, redesigning its plan and adding several loggias and the Barons Hall.

He died in 1456 in Naples.

1380 births
1456 deaths
Sculptors from Catalonia
Architects from Catalonia
Gothic architects
People from Mallorca
People from Felanitx

Catholic sculptors